Comanche is a city in Stephens County, Oklahoma, United States. The population was 1,663 at the 2010 census.

History

Comanche is a small city in southwest Oklahoma, set in rolling prairie land interspersed with oil fields, ranches, farms, pecan orchards, and timbered areas.

Comanche is located in what was once the famous Louisiana Purchase, a part of which was later in 1855 designated Indian Territory, and set aside for the Five Civilized Tribes. Comanche then became part of the Chickasaw Nation and was identified as Comanche, Indian Territory until statehood in 1907.

The city has had a series of names. The first settlers lived north of the present site and called the settlement Tucker. With the coming of the Rock Island Railroad in 1892, Indian landowner Johnny D. Wilson gave the city its present site on the railroad, and the Tucker post office was moved here in 1893. Many had wanted to call it Wilson Town, and some called it Border Queen because of the annual large celebrations, carnivals, bands, and Indian activities. Mr. Wilson, however, insisted it be named Comanche because of the Comanche Indians who roamed here.

The cattle were driven from Texas, through Indian Territory to Kansas for shipment east. Parts of this historic trail can still be clearly seen today.

Comanche has a colorful history that is still reflected in its lifestyle and activities. A western flavor is felt here, and Comanche is often called the "rodeo capital of the world". Certainly, many World Champion Rodeo performers call Comanche home. Race horse, Quarter Horse owners, and farmers add their influence as do oil companies and oil field workers. Authentic Indian customs and tribal observations are still practiced. Artists, educators, and others add still more variety and culture. Truly, it can be said that Comanche's greatest asset is its diversity of talent and people.

Geography
Comanche is located at  (34.365189, -97.968640).

Climate

Demographics

As of the census of 2000, there were 1,556 people, 642 households, and 446 families residing in the city. The population density was 340.1 people per square mile (131.5/km). There were 757 housing units at an average density of 165.5 per square mile (64.0/km). The racial makeup of the city was 87.53% White, 0.06% African American, 8.35% Native American, 0.26% Asian, 0.64% from other races, and 3.15% from two or more races. Hispanic or Latino of any race were 1.74% of the population.

There were 642 households, out of which 30.7% had children under the age of 18 living with them, 53.6% were married couples living together, 10.7% had a female householder with no husband present, and 30.5% were non-families. 27.7% of all households were made up of individuals, and 15.6% had someone living alone who was 65 years of age or older. The average household size was 2.42 and the average family size was 2.96.

In the city, the population was spread out, with 25.5% under the age of 18, 9.6% from 18 to 24, 24.6% from 25 to 44, 22.4% from 45 to 64, and 17.9% who were 65 years of age or older. The median age was 38 years. For every 100 females, there were 95.0 males. For every 100 females age 18 and over, there were 91.3 males.

The median income for a household in the city was $24,960, and the median income for a family was $28,654. Males had a median income of $26,250 versus $17,500 for females. The per capita income for the city was $13,612. About 20.1% of families and 21.8% of the population were below the poverty line, including 34.3% of those under age 18 and 13.4% of those age 65 or over.

Education
Comanche is served by the Comanche Public School system and the nearby Cameron University branch located in Duncan.

Notable people
Alvin Dark, World Series champion with the New York Giants as their shortstop in 1954 and with the Oakland Athletics as their manager in 1974, was born in Comanche.
Viola Fletcher, survivor of the Tulsa race massacre, was born in Comanche in 1914

Boyd Franklin Morgan Actor and American football running back in the National Football League for the Washington Redskins. He played college football at the University of Southern California and was drafted in the 18th round of the 1939 NFL Draft.

Recreation
Recreation in the Comanche Area is divided into lake activities and sports. The lake's recreational area offers all related activities (camping, swimming, fishing, boating, and hunting) and adds little to the pleasure and economy of Comanche. There are opportunities for fishing, camping, picknicking. Two covered pavilions may be reserved for family reunions or gatherings. A full concession stand is operated by lake caretakers. The Golf Course is located next to the Comanche Lake. This small 9-hole golf course is a spot for both local and area golfers. Kinder Park and Jackson Park playgrounds are areas for the little ones.

Government
Comanche has a Council Manager Form of Government. Progress is encouraged by Comanche citizens, officials, and civic groups.

Media
Comanche and its surrounding area is served by the weekly newspaper "The Comanche Times"

References

External links

 Encyclopedia of Oklahoma History and Culture - Comanche  (Town)

Cities in Stephens County, Oklahoma
Cities in Oklahoma